Şalom is a Jewish weekly newspaper published in Turkey. Its name is the Turkish spelling of the Hebrew word  (Shalom). It was established on 29 October 1947 by the Turkish Jewish journalist Avram Leyon. It is printed in Istanbul and is published every Wednesday. Apart from one Ladino (Judaeo-Spanish) page, it is published in Turkish. From 1947 to 1984, the newspaper was published exclusively in Ladino. However, due to the massive decline of Ladino and the language shift to Turkish in the Turkish Jewish community over the decades, the newspaper switched to Turkish and the Ladino content was reduced to one page in 1984. İvo Molinas is its publisher, and Yakup Barokas is its editor in chief. Its circulation is about 5,000.

See also

 El Amaneser, a Turkish  monthly newspaper in Ladino affiliated to Şalom and published in Istanbul
 Aki Yerushalayim, an Israeli magazine in Ladino published 2–3 times a year in Jerusalem

References

External links 
  
 The Ladino page of Şalom 

Newspapers published in Istanbul
Weekly newspapers published in Turkey
Jewish newspapers
Turkish-language newspapers
Judaeo-Spanish-language newspapers
Publications established in 1947
Jewish Turkish history
1947 establishments in Turkey
Jews and Judaism in Istanbul
Sephardi Jewish culture in Turkey